The Ukrainian Catholic Archeparchy of Przemyśl–Warsaw is an ecclesiastical territory or ecclesiastical province of the Ukrainian Greek Catholic Church — a particular Eastern Catholic Church, that is located in the south-eastern part of Poland. It was erected in 1996. Its Byzantine Rite services are conducted in the Ukrainian language. As a metropolitan see, it has two suffragan sees: Olsztyn–Gdańsk and Wrocław-Koszalin. The incumbent ordinary of the archeparchy is Eugeniusz Popowicz. It is assisted and protected by the Dicastery for the Eastern Churches in Rome. The cathedral church of the archeparchy is the Cathedral of St. John the Baptist, in the city of Przemyśl. Although the national capital of Warsaw was added to its title, there is no co-cathedral.

Former cathedrals
Both former cathedrals (now Orthodox churches) are elsewhere in Podkarpackie Voivodeship:
 Supraśl Orthodox Monastery of the Annunciation, in Supraśl.

Ecclesiastical province 
The Metropolitan has two Suffragan Eparchies:
 Ukrainian Catholic Eparchy of Olsztyn–Gdańsk
 Ukrainian Catholic Eparchy of Wrocław-Koszalin

Statistics 
As per 2014, it pastorally served 30,000 Eastern Catholics in 69 parishes and 2 missions with 44 priests (33 diocesan, 11 religious), 4 deacons, 96 lay religious (14 brothers, 82 sisters), 7 seminarians.

History 
In 1087 the Eparchy of Przemyśl was established in the Principality of Peremyshl as Eastern Orthodox eparchy.

The town initially did not adhere to the Union of Brest (1595–96) thus having for a short period two bishops. In 1679, Innocenty Winnicki became the Orthodox bishop and on 23 June 1691 Innocenty publicly accepted the Union for himself and for his eparchy, and he remained the only bishop of the town after that the Greek Catholic bishop  on the same year moved to Chełm. Innokentiy Vynnyckyj was succeeded in 1700 by his brother by Yurij Vynnyckyj who later became Metropolitan of Kyiv and Galicia.

On 10 February 1934, it lost territory to establish the Apostolic Administration of Łemkowszczyzna

In 1946, Bishop Josaphat Kotsylovsky was arrested and extradited to the USSR, where he died in prison. In Poland, where the city of Przemysl and a majority of the eparchy was located (a portion was in the Ukrainian SSR), all priests were arrested and given sentences of between four and ten years. One hundred Ukrainian Greek Catholic priests remained in Poland.  After their release, they kept a low profile, serving in the Latin rite Church, many as convent chaplains. Sixteen worked giving pastoral care to Ukrainian Catholics at pastoral centres.  In 1977, the Latin Catholic Primate of Poland's Vicar-General for Ukrainian Greek Catholics was also named Dean of the Przemysl Eparchy by the Vatican. Cardinal Josyf Slipyj objected to this action as contrary to his prerogatives and appointed the same priest Administrator of the eparchy. In 1981, a second Vicar-General to the Primate was appointed for Ukrainian Greek Catholics in Poland outside of the traditional boundaries of the Przemysl Eparchy.

On 16 January 1991, it gained back the territory from the suppressed daughter Apostolic Exarchate of Łemkowszczyzna (above, promoted in 1941, de facto defunct since 1947).

On 24 May 1996, the eparchy was promoted to Metropolitan Archdiocese of Przemyśl–Warszawa (Polish) / Przemysl–Warsaw (English) / Przemyśl–Varsavia (Curiate Italian) / Premislien(sis)–Varsavien(sis) ritus byzantini ucraini (Latin adjective).

It enjoyed a Papal visit from the Polish Pope John Paul II in June 1999.

On 25 November 2020 it lost the territory along with the Ukrainian Catholic Eparchy of Wrocław–Koszalin to establish the new Ukrainian Catholic Eparchy of Olsztyn–Gdańsk.

Episcopal ordinaries
(all Ukrainian rite)

Eparchs (Bishops) of Przemyśl (Ukrainian Rite)
 Innokentiy Vynnyckyj (1679–1700), adhered to the Union of Brest in 1691
 Yurij Vynnyckyj (later Metropolitan of Kiev) (1700–1713)
 Lev Kiszka (later Metropolitan of Kiev) (1713–1715)
  (1715–1746)
  (1746–1762)
  (1762–1779)
 Maksymilian Rylo, Administrator (1780–1785)
 Maksymilian Rylo (1785–1793)
 Petro Bilyanskyi, Administrator (1793–1796)
 Antin Anhelovych (later Metropolitan of Lviv) (1796–1808.03.16)
 Mihail Lewicki (later Cardinal) (1813.09.20 – 1816.03.08)
 Ivan Snihurskyi (1818.03.30 – 1847.08.24)
 Hryhoriy Yakhymovych (later Metropolitan of Lviv) (1848.09.05 – 1860.03.23)
 Toma Polyanskyi (1860.03.23 – 1867.10.01)
 Joseph Sembratovych, Ap. Administrator (1867.10.01 – 1872.09.08) Tit. Archbishop 
 Ivan Stupnytskyi (1872.09.08 – 1890.12.22) Julian Sas-Kuilovsky, Ap. Administrator (1890.12. – 1891.09.22)
 ?= Auxiliary Bishop:  Bishop Julian Kuiłovskyi (later Archbishop) (1890.06.26 – 1891.09.22)
 Yulian Pelesh (1891.09.22 – 1896.04.22)
 Konstantyn Chekhovych (1896.11.17 – 1915.04.28)
 Blessed Josaphat Joseph Kotsylovsky, O.S.B.M. (1917.01.29 – 1947.11.17)
 Auxiliary Bishop: Blessed Bishop Hryhoriy Lakota (1926.02.10 – 1950.11.12)
 See vacant (1947.11.17 – 1977.04.02)
 Ivan Choma (1977.04.02 – 1991.06.16) (in exile, residence in Rome)
 Jan Martyniak (1991.01.16 – 1996.05.24 see below), succeeding as previous Titular Bishop of Vardimissa (1989.07.20 – 1991.01.16) and Auxiliary Bishop of Przemyśl of the Ukrainians (1989.07.20 – 1991.01.16)

Metropolitan Archeparchs (Archbishops) of Przemyśl–Warsaw 
 Jan Martyniak (see above 1996.05.24 – 2015.11.07)
 Eugeniusz Popowicz (2015.11.07 – ...), succeeding as former Titular Bishop of Horrea Cœlia (2013.11.04 – 2015.11.07) and Auxiliary Bishop of Przemyśl–Warszawa of the Ukrainians (2013.11.04 – 2015.11.07).

References

Sources and external links 
 GCatholic.org, with Google map & satellite photo - data for all sections
 Catholic Hierarchy
 Archeparchy website (Polish and Ukrainian)
 

Eparchies of the Ukrainian Greek Catholic Church in Poland
Eparchies of the Ruthenian Uniate Church
Przemyśl
1087 establishments in Europe
Dioceses established in the 11th century
Eastern Catholicism in the Polish–Lithuanian Commonwealth
Ukrainians in Poland
Eastern Catholicism in Poland